Siyaram Tiwari (born 5 December 1934) is a prominent Hindi professor, scholar and author known throughout India and abroad.

Education 
 M.A. (Hindi) – Bihar University, Muzaffarpur, 1958
 Ph. D. – Patna University, 1962
 D. Litt – Patna University, 1974

Career 
After teaching in several colleges of Bihar, Tiwari joined Visva-Bharati, Santiniketan (West Bengal), an institution founded by Nobel laureate Rabindranath Tagore and now a central university as a reader in the Department of Hindi in January, 1976. In due course, he rose to the rank of professor and became head of the Department of Hindi as well as dean of the Faculty of Humanities & Social Sciences. After final retirement in 1999 he was invited as a visiting professor in the University of Hyderabad in 2000 and Hungarian Transylvania University (Romania) in the year 2006. He served Nalanda Open University, Patna as chief co-ordinator in the Faculty of Languages for three years.

Recent work – Jo Yeh Padhe Hanuman Chalisa 
Tiwari has published a comprehensive commentary on the most popular hymn of Lord Hanuman named Hanuman Chalisa with the name "Jo Yeh Padhe Hanuman Chalisa". Forty verses of the hymn have been explained so elaborately that the work has covered about 250 pages.

Distinction 
 He has written more than twenty books on Hindi literature.
 After retirement he was Prime Minister's nominee in Viswa-Bharati Court.
 He assisted Union Public Service Commission in its confidential work in several capacities.
 He was member of different bodies of so many universities of India.
 He was felicitated by Bhartiya Hindi Parishad, a premier organization of University Hindi teachers in its annual conference held in Lucknow University in October 2011.
 He delivered lectures in Refresher Courses organized by University Grants Commission in different universities.
 He participated in national and international seminars organized by universities and learned institutions.
 He has published a large number of research papers, critical articles, book reviews etc. in reputed Hindi journals and magazines.
 He receives invitation of Akashwani and Doordarshan for talk etc.

Foreign country visited 
He visited Romania in 2006 for delivering lectures.

Published works
 Hindi Ke Madhyakalin Khandkavya, Delhi, 1964
 Bajjika Bhasha Aur Sahitya, Patna, 1964
 Haladhardaskrirt Sudamacharitra, Patna, 1966
 Siddhant, Addhyayan Aur Samasyayen, Patna, 1967
 Kavyabhasha, New Delhi, 1976
 Sahityashashtra Aur Kavyabhasha, Sahibabad, 1978
 Renu: Kartritva Aur Kritiyan, Patna, 1983
 Tulasidas Ka Acharyatva, New Delhi, 1985
 Pathanusandhan, Allahabad, 1987
 Nandlal Bose, New Delhi, 1991
 Sahitya Aur Hindi Sahitya, Patna, 1992
 Manjhan, New Delhi, 1998
 Jankivallabh Shastri: Kartritva Aur Kritiyan, Allahabad, 1998
 Anandshankar Madhavan Ki Sarasvat Sadhana, Mandar Vidyapith, 1999
 Chintan Ki Rekhayen, Delhi, 2003
 Hindi Sahitya: Bhashik Paridrishya, Delhi, 2005
 Suni Acharaj Karai Jani Koyi, New Delhi, 2008
 Bhartiya Sahitya Ki Pahchan, Patna, 2009
 Romania Yatra Ki Diary, Ahamedabad, 2009
 Pataliputra Se Santiniketan, Darbhanga, 2011
 Mahamanav Rabindranath Aur Anya Nibandh
 Jo Yeh Padhe Hanuman Chalisa
 Shailesh Matiyani Ke Patra (under print)

Referred 
 Who's Who of Indian Writers, Sahitya Akademi, New Delhi
 Sahityakar Vivarnika, Central Hindi Directorate, New Delhi
 Hindi Sahitya ka Itihas by Dr Nagendra, New Delhi
 Hindi Sahitya ka Itihas by Dr Surya Prasad Dikshit, Lucknow

Works on Siyaram Tiwari 

 Dr Siyaram Tiwari: Vyakti Aur Upalabdhi by Dr Ramdeo Prasad & Dr Chakradhar Tripathi, Santiniketan, 2000
 Dr Siyaram Tiwari: Antarang Vivechan by Dr Ram Pravesh Singh, New Delhi, 2003
 Dr Siyaram Tiwari Ka Rachana Sansar by Dr Mahatha Ramkrishna Murari, Darbhanga, 2011
 Hindi Gadya Shitya ko Dr Siyaram Tiwari ki den by Dr Arvind Amar, Patna, 2019
 Patra : Dr Siyaram Tiwari ke Naam, Edited by Dr Uma Shankar Singh, Patna, 2020

References  

Living people
1934 births
Writers from Patna